Martin Zlatohlavý (born 2 November 1985) is a Slovak football defender. He previously played for MFK Dolný Kubín, FK Spišská Nová Ves and Polish 1. Liga club Sandecja Nowy Sącz. He made his senior debut for Tatran Prešov against ŠKP Devín on 17 June 2003.

External links
at fotbalportal.cz

References

1985 births
Living people
Slovak footballers
Association football defenders
1. FC Tatran Prešov players
MFK Dolný Kubín players
Sandecja Nowy Sącz players
Slovak Super Liga players
Slovak expatriate footballers
Expatriate footballers in Poland
Slovak expatriate sportspeople in Poland
Sportspeople from Prešov